Gustavo Fernández defeated Stefan Olsson in the final, 7–5, 6–3 to win the men's singles wheelchair tennis title at the 2019 Australian Open. It was his second Australian Open singles title and third major singles title overall.

Shingo Kunieda was the defending champion, but was defeated by Olsson in the semifinals.

Seeds

Draw

Draw

References

External links
 Drawsheets on ausopen.com

Wheelchair Men's Singles
2019 Men's Singles